Behind The Bright Lights is the second and final studio album by metalcore band Fei Comodo. It was released on July 16, 2012, although it was originally due to be released on 14 May 2012. A special edition of the album was also released which contained bonus material, including acoustic performances, guitar tutorials and two music videos, alongside the album tracks. Two of the tracks on the album, "No Way Out" and "A Man Left Behind", had previously been released on the EP, The Life They Lead.

Background
Following the release of their first mini-album They All Have Two Faces, the band wanted to act quickly and get a full album out within a year. After touring in support of their first album they got together in September 2009 to start recording their next album. However things didn't go as planned and it would be almost a further three years before the album would be released. During the intermediate period, Fei Comodo released an EP, The Life They Lead, which included two tracks, "No Way Out" and "A Man Left Behind", which would later feature on Behind The Bright Lights.

During this time the band members starting pursuing other musical ventures, and by the time "Behind The Bright Lights" was ready for release, the band announced their separation due to no longer being the same people they were when they recorded the music.

PledgeMusic Project

On 17 February 2012 Fei Comodo announced that they were intending to release a special edition of Behind The Bright Lights and were running a project using PledgeMusic, a crowd funding website, in order to do so. By receiving pre-orders of the album through the site, the band were able to generate the required capital to produce the special edition - an example of fan-funded music. Fans were also able to purchase a variety of other exclusive content through the site, such as signed set lists, guitar lessons and private acoustic performances by the band. As an extra incentive, the band posted studio updates and released certain material early to fans who pre-ordered the album.

Behind The Bright Lights was released two weeks before the official release date, via download, to fans who had 'pledged' on the album.

Supporting tour
The band went out during the summer of 2012 to play a series of final shows after the release of Behind The Bright Lights, with support coming from I Divide, Evarose and Paige. Drummer Rob Clemson was not able to perform due to injuries suffered on a previous tour, but he did appear at the London show to sing his vocal parts on the track "A Different World" from the album.

Track listing

Personnel
Fei Comodo
Marc Halls - Vocals
Will Phillipson - Guitar
Mike Curtis - Guitar
Rob Clemson - Drums
Jay Styler - Bass

References

Fei Comodo PledgeMusic Project (certain content not available to all)

2012 albums
Fei Comodo albums